Alismatid monocots (alismatids, basal monocots) is an informal name for a group of early branching (hence basal) monocots, consisting of two orders, the Acorales and  Alismatales. The name has also been used to refer to the Alismatales alone. Monocots are frequently treated as three informal groupings based on their branching from ancestral monocots and shared characteristics:  alismatid monocots, lilioid monocots (the five other non-commelinid monocots) and commelinid monocots. Research at the Royal Botanical Gardens, Kew is organised into two teams I: Alismatids and Lilioids and II: Commelinids. A similar approach is taken by Judd in his Plant systematics.

Phylogeny 

Cladogram showing the orders of monocots (Lilianae sensu Chase & Reveal) based on molecular  phylogenetic evidence according to the Angiosperm Phylogeny Group IV (APG IV).

Subdivision 

Of the two orders, the Acorales is monotypic, consisting of a single family, the Acoraceae, which in turn has a single genus, Acorus with two species. By contrast, the Alismatales is a much larger grouping, with about 13 families, 165 genera and about 4,500 species.

References

Bibliography 

 
 
 
 
  

Monocots